Ekaterina Stepanenko (born 21 May 1983) is a former Russian footballer. She played as a midfielder for Izmailovo Moscow and the Russia national team.

Club career
She played for FC Energy Voronezh before joining Izmailovo Moscow in 2010.

International career
She was called up to be part of the national team for the UEFA Women's Euro 2013.

Personal life
Stepanenko was born in Krasnoyarsk.

Honours
Izmailovo Moscow
Runner-up
 Russian Women's Cup: 2013

References

External links
 
 
 
 Ekaterina Stepanenko at Fussballtransfers.com 
 Ekaterina Stepanenko at Soccerdonna.de 

1983 births
Living people
Russian women's footballers
Musicians from Krasnoyarsk
Russia women's international footballers
FC Energy Voronezh players
CSP Izmailovo players
Women's association football defenders
Ryazan-VDV players
Russian Women's Football Championship players